A Virginia Courtship is a 1921 American silent drama film directed by Frank O'Connor and written by Edfrid A. Bingham based upon the play of the same name by Eugene Wiley Presbrey. The film stars May McAvoy, Alec B. Francis, Jane Keckley, L. M. Wells, Casson Ferguson, Kathlyn Williams, and Richard Tucker. The film was released in December 1921, by Paramount Pictures.

Plot
As described in a film magazine, Prudence Fairfax (McAvoy) is the ward of Colonel Fairfax (Francis), a lovable old Southern gentleman who has remained single because of a misunderstanding, some fifteen years previous, with his next door neighbor and childhood sweetheart Constance Llewellyn (Williams). While staging a chariot race she had seen on a poster, Pru is thrown from a runaway horse into a stream running through the Llewellyn estate and is rescued by Constance. They become fast friends. When the Fairfax Manor is about to be sold for a debt, Pru buys it through her broker Robin which almost precipitates a duel. However, a happy ending ensues when the old romance between the Colonel and Constance is renewed, and Pru marries the Colonel's nephew Tom (Ferguson) instead of Dwight Neville (Tucker), who is arrested for counterfeiting.

Cast
May McAvoy as Prudence Fairfax
Alec B. Francis as Colonel Fairfax
Jane Keckley as Betty Fairfax
L. M. Wells as Squire Fenwick
Casson Ferguson as	Tom Fairfax
Kathlyn Williams as Constance Llewellyn
Richard Tucker as Dwight Neville
Guy Oliver as Buck Lawton
Verne Winter as Zeb
George Reed as Sam
Blue Washington

Preservation status
The film is now lost.

References

External links

1921 films
1920s English-language films
Silent American drama films
1921 drama films
Paramount Pictures films
American black-and-white films
Lost American films
American silent feature films
1921 lost films
Lost drama films
Films directed by Frank O'Connor
1920s American films